The Common Front for Congo (FCC) is a parliamentary group in the National Assembly of the Democratic Republic of the Congo that includes the ruling party, the People's Party for Reconstruction and Democracy, among other parties. It is closely aligned with the former President of DR Congo from 2001 to 2019, Joseph Kabila, who formed it in mid 2018 to organise political forces for the December 2018 general election. Because of this it is also referred to as the Kabila coalition, as well as a successor to the Alliance of the Presidential Majority which was the majority pro-government bloc in both houses of Parliament from 2006 to 2018. Since the election, the FCC holds a majority in both the National Assembly and the Senate of the Democratic Republic of the Congo. During the April 2019 provincial elections, the FCC also secured the governorships of 16 of the 24 provinces in which votes were held. The FCC has been negotiating with the newly elected president, Félix Tshisekedi of the opposition, to form a new government. Having the majority in parliament, the FCC also appoints the next prime minister. The fact that the FCC controls the parliament and the provincial governments means that President Tshisekedi's ability to govern is limited.

On July 27, 2019, the FCC and President Tshisekedi's alliance came to an agreement on forming a new government. Sylvestre Ilunga's new cabinet will include 65 members, of which 42 will go to FCC candidates. Notably, the ministries of Defense, Justice, and Finance will be controlled by the Kabila coalition.

Electoral history

Presidency

Senate

National Assembly

References

Political party alliances in the Democratic Republic of the Congo